Buckland is an unincorporated community in Prince William County, Virginia.

Established in 1798, Buckland was an early inland stagecoach town, situated along the Fauquier and Alexandria Turnpike. An 1855 gazetteer described it as having "1 church and a few shops".

Buckland is the current site of the Buckland Historic District and Battle of Buckland Mills Civil War Battlefield.

References

External links 
Buckland Preservation Society

Buckland Historic District description from The Journey Through Hallowed Ground
Map of Buckland, VA from MapQuest*

Unincorporated communities in Prince William County, Virginia
Washington metropolitan area
Populated places established in 1798
Unincorporated communities in Virginia
1798 establishments in Virginia